Movistar CineDoc&Roll (formerly Movistar Xtra) was a Spanish television channel on the Movistar+ platform owned and operated by Telefónica.

External links
Official site

Movistar+
Television stations in Spain
Television channels and stations established in 2010
Television channels and stations disestablished in 2021